Taxi 13 is a 1928 silent film comedy produced and distributed by Film Booking Offices of America and directed by Marshall Neilan. The film stars Chester Conklin in what is FBO's first film with a pre-recorded soundtrack.

Once thought lost, a copy evidently survives at Cineteca Nazionale, Rome.

Critical reception
A review in Harrison's Reports said, "This is neither funny enojugh to be called a comedy nor serious enough to be called a drama.' Despite a few good points, it added, "But on the whole it is not a particularly good picture".

Cast
Chester Conklin as Angus Mactavish
Ethel Wales as Mrs. Mactavish
Martha Sleeper as Flora Mactavish
Hugh Trevor as Dan Regan
Lee Moran as Dennis Moran
Jerry Miley as Mason
Charles Byer as Berger

unbilled
Godfrey Craig as Mactavish Child
George Dunning as Mactavish Child
Louise Fazenda 
Jackie Sturnberg as Mactavish Child
Billy Watson as Mactavish Child
Coy Watson as Mactavish Child
Delmar Watson as Mactavish Child
Gloria Watson as Mactavish Child
Harry Watson as Mactavish Child
Louise Watson as Mactavish Child
Vivian Watson as Mactavish Child

References

External links

allmovie/synopsis; Taxi 13
 lobby poster

1928 films
Films directed by Marshall Neilan
Film Booking Offices of America films
1928 comedy films
Silent American comedy films
American black-and-white films
1920s rediscovered films
American silent feature films
Rediscovered American films
1920s American films